Volovets Pass is a mountain pass in the north-eastern Carpathian Mountains of Ukraine through the Vodorazdel'nyy backbone. Its crest is at  height. It is located on the border of Stryi Raion of the Lviv Oblast and the Volovets Raion of the Zakarpattia Oblast, on the watershed of the rivers Opir and Viche.

The southern slope of the pass is steep, while the northern flank is declivous. It consists of sandstones and slates. Volovets Pass is sparsely populated, with meadows dominating the landscape. Below the mountain pass there is a system of railway tunnels connecting Mukachevo and Stryj.

Automobile traffic across the pass is impossible since the road is too difficult to traverse. The nearest settlements are Oporets and Skotarske.

See also
Beskydy Tunnel

Further reading
 Географическая энциклопедия Украины, УСЭ, 1989—1993 гг. ( in Russian . Ukrainian Geografical Encyclopedia, the part of Ukrainian Soviet Encyclopedia, 1989–1993 years)
 Географічна енциклопедія України: в 3-х томах / Редколегія: О. М. Маринич (відпов. ред.) та ін. — К.: «Українська радянська енциклопедія» імені М. П. Бажана, 1989.(in Ukrainian. Geografical Encyclopedia, the part of Ukrainian Soviet Encyclopedia, 1989–1993 years)

Mountain passes of Ukraine
Mountain passes of the Carpathians